Anna Community Consolidated School District #37, or Anna District 37, is a school district headquartered in the Anna Junior High School/Davie School facility in Anna, Illinois.

The district operates elementary and middle schools. Anna-Jonesboro Community High School is operated by its own district.

Schools
 Anna Jr High School (grades 5-8) and Davie School (grades 3-4) - in same building
 Lincoln School (Kindergarten-Grade 2)
 Pre-K

References

External links
 

School districts in Illinois
Education in Union County, Illinois